The blotched blind snake (Afrotyphlops congestus) is a species of snake in the Typhlopidae family.

References

congestus
Reptiles described in 1844
Taxa named by André Marie Constant Duméril
Taxa named by Gabriel Bibron